"Hip Hop Holiday" is the debut single from New Zealand hip hop group 3 The Hard Way. It reached #1 in the New Zealand singles chart and #17 in Australia. A mid-song reggae breakdown was provided by Bobbylon of the Hallelujah Picassos.

Background 

The song was built around a substantial interpolation of "Dreadlock Holiday" by 10cc. However, the rights were never cleared, resulting in the song being officially credited to "Dreadlock Holiday" songwriters Eric Stewart, Graham Gouldman, with all royalties going to the pair.

The success of the song in New Zealand and Australia led to extensive touring of both countries and the recording and release of band's debut album, Old School Prankstas

"Hip Hop Holiday" was nominated for Single of the Year at the 1995 New Zealand Music Awards.

Music video 

A music video was made for "Hip Hop Holiday", directed by Clinton Phillips. The video was filmed in Auckland, New Zealand and features the group driving around the city in a convertible and hosting a house party in suburban Auckland.

Track listings

CD single (DG016, D11633)
 "Hip Hop Holiday" (Radio Mix) - feat Bobbylon
 "Get Down" (First Up Mix)		
 "Hip Hop Holiday" (Freestyle Mix)		
 "Get Down" (Extended Mix)

Charts

"Hip Hop Holiday" was the first hip hop song by a New Zealand artist to reach #1 in the New Zealand charts. The song was also certified gold in New Zealand.

Weekly charts

Year-end charts

References

External links 

 "Hip Hop Holiday" at Discogs
 "Hip Hop Holiday" music video

Number-one singles in New Zealand
1994 debut singles
Songs written by Eric Stewart
Songs written by Graham Gouldman
1994 songs